Middle Island is a small, uninhabited island in the South Atlantic Ocean, part of the Nightingale Islands. It is governed as part of Tristan da Cunha, an archipelago that is part of the British overseas territory of Saint Helena, Ascension and Tristan da Cunha.  The island is part of the Nightingale Islands group Important Bird Area (IBA), identified as such by BirdLife International as a breeding site for seabirds and endemic landbirds. It is also known as Alex Island.

References

External links
Photograph of Stoltenhoff and Middle Island

Islands of Tristan da Cunha
Uninhabited islands of Saint Helena, Ascension and Tristan da Cunha
Important Bird Areas of Saint Helena
Seabird colonies